Operation Hypocrite is the debut EP by English hard rock band Die So Fluid. The EP was recorded at Gravity Shack, South London in February 2001 and produced by the band. It was released by Sanctuary Records.

Track listing
All tracks are written by Die So Fluid. All lyrics by Grog Prebble.

 Operation Hypocrite - 3:26
 Hard Feelings - 3:27
 Hedonist - 2:51
 Concealed Machine - 3:24

Personnel
 Georgina 'Grog' Lisee – Vocals & Bass
 Al Fletcher – Drums
 Drew Richards – Guitar

Recording details
 Engineer – Pat Collier (tracks: 1 to 4)
 Music - Die So Fluid
 Lyrics - Grog Prebble 
 Produced – Die So Fluid

Releases
CD, Maxi-Single– RAWCD146
 August 6, 2001
 Operation Hypocrite - 3:26
 Hard Feelings - 3:27
 Hedonist - 2:51
 Concealed Machine - 3:24

References

2001 debut EPs
Die So Fluid albums
Sanctuary Records EPs